The Mysterious Pilot is a 15-episode 1937 Columbia movie serial based on the book by William Byron Mowery and starring the record-breaking aviator Frank Hawks. This was the second serial produced by Columbia. In the serial, Hawks plays a flying "mountie".

Plot
Carter Snowden (Kenneth Harlan) about to marry Jean McNain (Dorothy Sebastian), is accused of murder. When his accuser is killed, Jean flees the train she is on, and heads into the Canadian woods. Snowden sends a bodyguard to find Jean, who appeals to RCMP Captain Jim Down (Frank Hawks) for help. With his friend "Kansas" (Rex Lease) and Indian Luke (Yakima Canutt), Jim hides Jean.

Snowden tracks down Jean and tries to lure her to his aircraft by telling her that Jim is injured and needs her. As soon as they realize what has happened, Jim and Kansas take to the air and force Snowden's aircraft down. Jean is unhurt but Snowden dies in the crash. Trying to get down to Jean, Jim's parachute gets tangled in the trees and Jean ends up rescuing him.

Chapter titles
 The Howl of the Wolf
 The Web Tangles
 Enemies of the Air
 In the Hands of the Law
 The Crack-up
 The Dark Hour
 Wings of Destiny
 Battle in the Sky
 The Great Flight
 Whirlpool of Death
 The Haunted Mill
 The Lost Trail
 The Net Tightens
 Vengeance Rides the Airways
 Retribution
Source:

Cast
 Frank Hawks as Captain Jim Down 
 Dorothy Sebastian as Jean McNain
 Esther Ralston as Vivian McNain
 Rex Lease as RCAF Sergeant "Kansas" Eby
 Guy Bates Post as "Papa" Bergelot
 Kenneth Harlan as Carter Snowden
 Yakima Canutt as Indian Luke
 George Rosener as Fritz
 Clara Kimball Young as Martha, Fritz's Wife 
 Frank Lackteen as Yoroslaff, a henchman
 Harry Harvey as "Soft Shoe" Cardigan, a henchman
 Tom London as Kilgour, a henchman
 Bob Walker as Boyer, a lumberjack henchman
 Ted Adams as Carlson, a henchman

Production
Mysterious Pilot was adapted from the novel "The Silver Hawk" by William Byron Mowery. Frank Hawks was billed in Mysterious Pilot as the "Fastest airman in the world." After each episode, Hawks appeared to deliver a "flying lesson". A Sikorsky S-39 amphibian was featured in the serial.

References

Notes

Citations

Bibliography

 Cline, William C. "In Search of Ammunition." In the Nick of Time. New York: McFarland & Company, Inc., 1984. .
 Farmer, James H. Celluloid Wings: The Impact of Movies on Aviation. Blue Ridge Summit, Pennsylvania: Tab Books Inc., 1984. .
 Harmon, Jim and Donald F. Glut. "Real Life Heroes: Just Strangle the Lion in Your Usual Way". The Great Movie Serials: Their Sound and Fury. New York: Routledge Publishing, 1973. . 
 Pendo, Stephen. Aviation in the Cinema. Lanham, Maryland: Scarecrow Press, 1985. .
 Weiss, Ken and Ed Goodgold. To be Continued ...: A Complete Guide to Motion Picture Serials. New York: Bonanza Books, 1973. .

External links

1937 films
American aviation films
Northern (genre) films
American black-and-white films
1930s English-language films
Columbia Pictures film serials
Films based on American novels
Films directed by Spencer Gordon Bennet
1937 adventure films
American adventure films
Royal Canadian Mounted Police in fiction
1930s American films